Dietrich Conrad Smith (April 4, 1840 – April 18, 1914) was a U.S. Representative from Illinois.

Biography
Born in East Frisia, Hanover, (currently Germany), Smith immigrated to the United States with his parents, who settled in Pekin, Illinois, about 1850.
He attended the public schools of Pekin, Illinois, and Quincy College (now Quincy University), Quincy, Illinois.
During the Civil War he served in the Union Army as lieutenant in Company I, Eighth Regiment, Illinois Volunteer Infantry.
He left the service as captain of Company C, One Hundred and Thirty-ninth Regiment, Illinois Volunteer Infantry.
He was an organizer of the German College at Mount Pleasant in 1874.
He served as member of board of trustees of that institution for many years.
He served as member of the State house of representatives 1876-1878.
He engaged in banking and manufacturing and also in the construction and management of railroads in Illinois.

Smith was elected as a Republican to the Forty-seventh Congress (March 4, 1881 – March 3, 1883).
He was an unsuccessful candidate for reelection in 1882 to the Forty-eighth Congress.
He again engaged in banking.
He died in Pekin, Illinois, April 18, 1914.
He was interred in Lakeside Cemetery.

References

1840 births
1914 deaths
People from Pekin, Illinois
Quincy University alumni
Republican Party members of the Illinois House of Representatives
Union Army officers
Republican Party members of the United States House of Representatives from Illinois
19th-century American politicians
German emigrants to the United States
Military personnel from Illinois